A recession is a slowdown in economic activity over a sustained period of time usually defined as negative growth rate for two consecutive quarters .

Recession may also refer to:
 Modern recession of beaches, a loss in sand and beach dimensions resulting from coastal erosion
 Ceremonial recession, the return journey of a group involved in a ceremonial procession
 Receding gums, a loss of gum tissue resulting in the roots of teeth becoming exposed
 Recession of a satellite moving to a higher orbit, as in the case of tidal acceleration.
 Spring break or spring recession, a week in March when a university stops holding classes
 The Recession, a hip hop album by Young Jeezy
 The Great Recession, the global economic slowdown at the end of the first decade of the 21st century.

See also